Lincos may refer to:

Lincos language, designed for extraterrestrial contact
LINCOS, sustainable development project in Costa Rica